Biggar RFC is a rugby union club based in Biggar, South Lanarkshire, Scotland. Founded in 1975, the team plays its home games at Hartree Mill.

History

The club was formed in 1975 by five men who had been heavily involved in rugby clubs in their younger days and thought that the area might sustain a new social rugby club. These were Dr. Mike Bewsher (Melrose), Richard Carr (Harlequins), Les Clerihew (Stewarts College), Archie Stott (Hawick Trades) and Tom Wight (Melrose).

Twenty-eight years later, at the end of season 2003–04, the club found itself promoted to the top division in Scotland for season 2004–05. In the 2005–06 season, the club finished 5th in the Scottish Premiership. In their second season, they slipped to relegation. In 2012–13 season the club finished 8th in the National League, the second tier of club rugby, after a late season run of good results.

The club happened to be in the Edinburgh District set up but is not in Edinburgh. On the fringes of the Scottish Borders, it is in South Lanarkshire.

The club recently developed its playing facilities and now has 5 pitches, 4 of which are floodlit. The Club's facilities are used by Biggar Football Club and Biggar Athletics club (a satellite of Law Athletics Club)

Biggar's most notable player is Scott Lawson. The hooker played for Biggar before going on to gain 46 Scotland caps at full international level.

The club currently has 250 School aged members.

Biggar Sevens

The club run the Biggar Sevens tournament.

Honours

Peebles Sevens
 Champions (2): 1993, 1995
Walkerburn Sevens
 Champions (2): 2008, 2009
 Arran Sevens
 Champions (1): 2008

Notable players
Two other Scotland Internationalists are Fraser Brown who is currently part of the Scotland squad (50 caps) and Donna Kennedy who still holds the record as being Scotland's most capped international (115 caps).

References

External links

Scottish rugby union teams
Rugby clubs established in 1975
Biggar, South Lanarkshire
1975 establishments in Scotland
Rugby union in South Lanarkshire